Tullamore GAA is a Gaelic Athletic Association club located in the town of Tullamore, County Offaly, Ireland.  The club is concerned with both hurling and Gaelic football and competes in Offaly GAA competitions.

History

Honours
 Offaly Senior Football Championships: (28)
 1896, 1897, 1898, 1899, 1908, 1911, 1912, 1913, 1917, 1924, 1925, 1926, 1930, 1932, 1935, 1941, 1946, 1948, 1954, 1956, 1963, 1973, 1977, 2000, 2002, 2007, 2013, 2021
 Leinster Senior Club Hurling Championship: (0)
 Runner- Up 2009
 Offaly Senior Hurling Championships: (10)
 1909, 1932, 1934, 1935, 1936, 1937, 1955, 1959, 1964, 2009
 Offaly Intermediate Football Championship (3)
 1953, 1999, 2004
 Offaly Intermediate Hurling Championships: (3)
 1929, 1933, 1989
 Offaly Junior Football Championship (8)
 1907, 1930, 1942, 1949, 1972, 1984, 1993, 2013
 Offaly Junior A Hurling Championships: (2)
 1925, 1930

Notable players
 Shane Dooley
 Martin Furlong
 Martin Heffernan
 Kevin Martin

External links
 Offaly GAA site
 Tullamore GAA site
 http://www.gaelicsportscast.com/2012/06/28/373-new-hurling-club-in-charleston-south-carolina/
 http://www.charlestonhurling.com/news/article/hurling-catching-on-in-charleston

Gaelic games clubs in County Offaly
Hurling clubs in County Offaly
Gaelic football clubs in County Offaly
Sport in Tullamore